Nausinoe piabilis is a moth in the family Crambidae. It was described by Wallengren in 1876. It is found in South Africa.

References

Endemic moths of South Africa
Moths described in 1876
Spilomelinae